Lejiacocha (possibly from Quechua lliklla a rectangular shoulder cloth, qucha lake,) is a lake in the Cordillera Blanca in the Andes of Peru at  of elevation. It is located in Marcará District, Carhuaz Province, Ancash. Lejiacocha lies south-west of mount Copa.

Legiamayo River originates nearby the lake.

References 

Lejiacocha
Lejiacocha